Bent Pedersen (13 July 1928 – 13 February 2001) was a Danish footballer. He played in two matches for the Denmark national football team in 1956.

References

1928 births
2001 deaths
Danish men's footballers
Denmark international footballers
Place of birth missing
Association footballers not categorized by position